Simonini Racing S.r.l. is an Italian automotive and aircraft engine manufacturer based in San Dalmazio di Serramazzoni. The company specializes in the design and manufacture of small engines and racing conversion kits for motorcycles and microlight aircraft.

Simonini Racing is organized as a Società a responsabilità limitata, an Italian limited liability company.

The company produces a line of small engines, racing conversion kits, mufflers and parts. Their aircraft engines are all one and two cylinder two-stroke designs and include the 200cc, Mini 2 Evo, Mini 2 Plus, Mini 3, Mini 4 Victor 1 Super, Victor 2 and the Victor 2 Super.

The company's small and lightweight engines have been widely used in smaller ultralight aircraft and especially ultralight trikes such as the AEF Monotrace and powered paragliders, such as the Dynamic Sport Climber Fresh Breeze Simonini, Paraavis Vityaz, Sperwill 2+, Sperwill 3+, Time To Fly Backplane SL and the Walkerjet Simon.

Engines

References

External links
 for ground vehicle engines and components
 for aircraft engines

Aircraft manufacturers of Italy
Aircraft engines
Simonini aircraft engines